The 10th constituency of Isère is one of ten French legislative constituencies in the Isère département.

It was created in the 2010 redistricting of French legislative constituencies and consists of the (pre-2015 cantonal re-organisation) cantons of
Bourgoin-Jallieu-Sud, La Verpillière, L'Isle-d'Abeau, La Tour-du-Pin and Pont-de-Beauvoisin.

Deputies

Election Results

2022

 
 
 
|-
| colspan="8" bgcolor="#E9E9E9"|
|-

2017

2012

References

10